Robert Jan Havekotte (born January 25, 1967 in De Bilt) is a retired water polo player from the Netherlands, who finished in ninth position with the Dutch team at the 1992 Summer Olympics in Barcelona.

As of 2008 he is a board member at UNIBA Partners, an independent network of insurance brokers.

Personal life
Havekotte is the father of Mike Havekotte, who is a professional footballer.

References

 Dutch Olympic Committee
 UNIBA Partners

1967 births
Living people
Dutch male water polo players
Olympic water polo players of the Netherlands
People from De Bilt
Water polo players at the 1992 Summer Olympics
Sportspeople from Utrecht (province)